The 1986 West Dorset District Council election was held on Thursday 8 May 1986 to elect councillors to West Dorset District Council in England. It took place on the same day as other district council elections in the United Kingdom. One third of seats were up for election.

The 1986 election saw the Independent councillors maintain their majority control on the Council.

Ward results

Beaminster

Bothenhampton

Bradford Abbas

Bridport North

Cerne Valley

Chickerell

Dorchester East

Dorchester North

Dorchester South

Dorchester West

Holnest

Lyme Regis

Netherbury

Owermoigne

Queen Thorne

Sherborne East

Sherborne West

Winterborne St Martin

Yetminster

References

West Dorset
1986
20th century in Dorset